Seconds is a 1966 American psychological horror science fiction film directed by John Frankenheimer and starring Rock Hudson, Salome Jens, John Randolph, and Will Geer. The film tells the story of a middle-aged New York banker who, disillusioned with his life, contacts an agency known as "The Company" which specializes in providing "rebirths" under new identities and appearances altered by plastic surgery. The screenplay by Lewis John Carlino was based on the 1963 novel of the same title by David Ely.

Filmed in New York and Malibu, California, in 1965, Seconds was entered into the 1966 Cannes Film Festival and released by Paramount Pictures. The cinematography by James Wong Howe was nominated for an Academy Award.

In 2015, the United States Library of Congress selected the film for preservation in the National Film Registry, finding it "culturally, historically, or aesthetically significant".

Plot
Arthur Hamilton is a middle-aged banking executive in New York who, despite his professional success, remains profoundly unfulfilled. His love for his wife, Emily, has dwindled, and he seldom sees his only child, now grown.

Arthur is approached by a stranger who gives him an address. Later that day he receives a call from Charlie, his school friend from Harvard whom he believed to be dead. Charlie recounts personal anecdotes that only he could know. Charlie informs Arthur that he must go the address provided, and that the company will save him from his empty life.

Arthur takes up Charlie's proposition, and travels to the address, then is redirected through a circuitous series of addresses. At one location, he is  drugged and tries to leave the complex. He wanders around until finding himself in a vulnerable woman's bedroom and, in his drugged state, he seemingly sexually assaults her.

After waking, Arthur is informed by the company's Mr. Ruby that their service costs $30,000. It will fake his death in a hotel fire using an anonymous cadaver, then reshape his appearance and provide a fresh start.  When Arthur is unsure, an older man, head of the company, shows Arthur a film of the prior staged assault, ostensibly to make his decision easier.

After considering the emptiness in his life, Arthur reluctantly accepts. He undergoes extensive procedures by Dr. Innes that transform not only his facial features, but his vocal cords, teeth, and even fingerprints.

After a lengthy healing period, the younger looking Arthur is conferred the identity Tony Wilson. Tony is relocated by the Company into a beachside community in California. He attempts to assimilate into his new life, in which he is able to live as an artist —a career he had always aspired to— though he soon finds himself growing restless. While walking the beach one day, Tony encounters Nora. The two develop a swift attraction, and Nora recounts how she came to leave her former life behind.

Tony accompanies Nora to a Dionysian-themed party in Santa Barbara. There, the revelers dance, sing, and stomp grapes in a large trough and, after some initial discomfort, Tony finally begins to enjoy himself.

Tony and Nora host a cocktail party for neighbors. Tony gets drunk over the course of the night, and begins to speak openly about his former identity. The male guests  remove Tony to a bedroom, where he learns that they are also "reborns".

Tony receives a phone call from Charlie, who warns him that he has put himself in danger by violating the company's rules. Charlie also reveals that Nora is an employee of the Company who covertly helps new "reborns" to a smooth transition.

Disenchanted by his new contrived life, Tony defiantly returns to New York. He arranges a meeting with Emily at his former home, claiming that he was once a friend of Arthur's. Emily shares that she felt Arthur was emotionally disconnected from his life, and was in a constant state of longing that she could not understand. After the meeting, a melancholic Tony is met by associates of the company, and he requests that they give him a different identity. They agree to do so, but only if he can provide them with another referral to the company.

Returning to the company's headquarters, Tony is placed in a waiting room with various other men, including his friend Charlie, all of whom have asked to undergo another 'rebirth'. An elated Charlie is chosen and is escorted from the waiting room. Frustrated at the unknown amount of time the men have been waiting to be chosen, and being unable to think of anyone that he can refer to the company, Arthur angrily demands that his procedure be performed without further delay.

During the night, the owner of the Company discusses with Tony/Arthur his original purpose for founding the organization, and assures him that the issues he has brought up will be looked into. As he is wheeled into the operating room, Dr. Morris gives his last rites. As Dr. Innes sedates him, he tells Arthur that he is to be killed, with his body to be staged as the corpse for a new client to be reborn.

Cast

Analysis
In the film The Pervert's Guide to Ideology, the psychoanalytical philosopher Slavoj Žižek discusses the film as an example of what happens when desires are fulfilled.

Production

Development
Frankenheimer had recently completed several successful films prior to his involvement with the project, namely Birdman of Alcatraz (1962), The Manchurian Candidate (1962), and Seven Days in May (1964). These last two films together with Seconds are sometimes referred to as Frankenheimer's 'paranoia trilogy'.

Casting
For the central role of Antiochus "Tony" Wilson, Frankenheimer had sought Kirk Douglas, whose company, Joel Productions, was producing the film. When Douglas was unavailable due to other commitments, Frankenheimer offered the role to Laurence Olivier. After reading the screenplay, Olivier agreed to take the part, but Paramount Pictures objected to the casting, believing that Olivier was not a big enough star at the time. Hudson was ultimately cast in the feature, despite attempts by friends and colleagues to dissuade him. He wanted to expand his range, feeling that he had been typecast because of his work in numerous romantic comedies. "He was one of the nicest guys I’ve ever met," Frankenheimer recounted. "He really wanted to do this picture, but he would only do it as the second character. He didn’t think he could handle the older character."

Filming
Principal photography of Seconds began on June 14, 1965, on a budget of $2.5 million. Filming primarily occurred in Malibu, California, where much of the film is set, with additional photography occurring in Scarsdale, New York, where the first act of the film takes place, as well as New York City. In order to successfully shoot a transition sequence in Grand Central Station, Frankenheimer hired a Playboy Bunny to pose as an actress filming a scene, during which she stripped down into a bikini in the terminal; this distracted onlookers, allowing Frankenheimer to successfully capture the footage he needed without interruption. The Dionysian-themed party sequence was shot on location with a handheld camera in Santa Barbara, California, during an annual wine festival held there.

The director of photography for Seconds was James Wong Howe, who pioneered novel techniques in black-and-white cinematography, and whose career spanned nearly five decades. While shooting the sequences inside The company's headquarters (which were constructed on the Paramount Studios lot), Howe employed an innovative system, which featured "complete lighting of sets for closeups, long shots, etc., sans separate setups, plus the use of ceilinged sets." Filming was completed in August 1965.

In Frankenheimer's commentary on the DVD, he notes:
An actual rhinoplasty operation was filmed to provide shots for inclusion in the depiction of Hamilton's plastic surgery. Frankenheimer shot some of the footage himself after the cameraman fainted.
The scenes in Wilson's Malibu beach house were filmed in Frankenheimer's own home.

Post-production
The opening titles of the film were designed by Saul Bass, using Helvetica set in white over optically warped black-and-white motion picture photography. During the editing process, Frankenheimer chose to excise a scene in which Arthur meets with his daughter in California after his transformation into Tony. Frankenheimer's wife, Evans Evans, portrayed Arthur's daughter in the scene. Frankenheimer later lamented his decision to remove the scene from the film, suggesting that it weakened the second act.

Additionally, a sequence in which Arthur encounters a father and his young daughter on the beach was removed from the final cut. A brief portion appears as the film's final shot, which Arthur recounts as he dies. The film's screenwriter, Lewis John Carlino, confirmed this in a 1997 interview: "That refers to a previous scene that was also cut. Hudson encounters a father and his young daughter on the beach. It’s the key scene for me. Without it, the last image doesn’t make sense."

Release 
Seconds premiered at the 1966 Cannes Film Festival on May 16, 1966, where it was nominated for the prestigious Palme d'Or. Despite the nomination, the film was not well received by the audience, and its screening ended with boos of disapproval.

The film premiered in the United States in New York City on October 5, 1966, and opened in Los Angeles the following month, on November 9, 1966.

Censorship
Paramount Pictures, the American distributor of the film, demanded that Frankenheimer cut approximately seven minutes of the film for its release in the United States. The footage that was ultimately excised for the American theatrical release consisted of the grape-stomping sequence that occurs at the party Arthur attends with Nora. The sequence, which features full-frontal nudity from the various extras, was deemed too controversial by the studio. Frankenheimer recalled: "The Catholic Church objected to the nudity, so it was cut. But it made the grape-stomping [seem] like an orgy. That was not my intention. It was supposed to be a release for [Arthur]."

The original 107-minute cut of the film had only been shown in Europe until May 1997, when the film was rereleased in the United States in its full form to commemorate its thirtieth anniversary.

Box office
Seconds performed poorly on its initial American release, and was considered a box office bomb. The film grossed an estimated $1.75 million in U.S. and Canadian rentals.

Critical response
A reviewer in Time commented: "Director John Frankenheimer and veteran photographer James Wong Howe manage to give the most improbable doings a look of credible horror. Once Rock appears, though, the spell is shattered, and through no fault of his own. Instead of honestly exploring the ordeal of assuming a second identity, the script subsides for nearly an hour into conventional Hollywood fantasy. [...] Seconds has moments, and that's too bad, in a way. But for its soft and flabby midsection, it might have been one of the trimmest shockers of the year."

Seconds has since gained an overall positive reaction, currently holding a 78% "fresh" rating on Rotten Tomatoes based on 59 reviews. Rotten Tomatoes' consensus reads: "Featuring dazzling, disorienting cinematography from the great James Wong Howe and a strong lead performance by Rock Hudson, Seconds is a compellingly paranoid take on the legend of Faust."

Writing in Time Out New York, Andrew Johnston (critic) observed: "Seconds is easily one of the most subversive films ever to have come out of Hollywood: Even as it exposes the folly of selfishly abandoning one's commitments, it also makes a passionate case for following one's heart and rejecting conformity....This chilling portrayal of a well-meaning guy stuck in a Kafkaesque nightmare is unlike anything else he [Hudson] did."

Accolades

Home media
Seconds was released on home video for the first time in May 1997. The film was released on DVD on January 8, 2002, and later went out of print. The Criterion Collection released a newly restored version of Seconds on DVD and Blu-ray on August 13, 2013.

Legacy
In the years since its release, Seconds has earned a reputation as a cult film. Directors Park Chan-Wook and Bong Joon-Ho named "Seconds" as one of their favourite films 

Seconds became known for its connection to the Beach Boys' Brian Wilson. The story, which originated in the October 1967 magazine article "Goodbye Surfing, Hello God!", goes that when he arrived late to a theater showing of Seconds, he appeared to be greeted with the onscreen dialogue, "Come in, Mr. Wilson." He was convinced for some time that rival producer Phil Spector (one of the film's investors) was taunting him through the movie, and that it was written about his recent traumatic experiences and intellectual pursuits, going so far as to note that "even the beach was in it, a whole thing about the beach." He later cancelled the Beach Boys' forthcoming album Smile, and the film reportedly frightened him so much that he did not visit another movie theater until 1982's E.T. the Extra-Terrestrial.

See also
 List of American films of 1966
 Body swap appearances in media
 Mind uploading
 Mind uploading in fiction
 Whole-body transplants in popular culture

References

Sources

</ref>

External links
 
 
 
 
 Movies You May Have Missed – Ep 13: Seconds
Three Reasons: Seconds video on the Criterion Collection

1966 films
1960s dystopian films
1960s English-language films
1960s psychological thriller films
1960s science fiction horror films
American black-and-white films
American psychological horror films
American psychological thriller films
American science fiction horror films
Bryna Productions films
Existentialist films
Films about consciousness
Films about secret societies
Films based on American novels
Films based on thriller novels
Films directed by John Frankenheimer
Films set in Malibu, California
Films shot in California
Films shot in New York (state)
Films scored by Jerry Goldsmith
Films with screenplays by Lewis John Carlino
United States National Film Registry films
Works about plastic surgery
1960s American films